CYF may refer to:
 Chow Yun-fat (born 1955), Hong Kong actor
 Cyf., a suffix for a private company limited by shares in Wales, short for 
 Chefornak Airport (IATA: CYF), an airport in Chefornak, Alaska
 Child, Youth and Family (New Zealand), a New Zealand social agency
  (as CYF or CyF), Spanish for "science fiction and fantasy" as a supergenre designation